The 12157 / 12158 Hutatma Express is a Superfast Express train belonging to Indian Railways – Central Railways Zone that runs between  and  in India.

It operates as train number 12157 from Pune Junction to Solapur Junction and as train number 12158 in the reverse direction.

It is one of two dedicated Intercity Trains between Pune & Solapur, the other being the 12169/70 Pune–Solapur Intercity Express.

Coaches

The 12157/58 Hutatma Express presently has 1 AC Chair Car, 13 Second Class seating & 6 General Unreserved coaches & 2 SLR (Seating cum Luggage Rake) coaches with 22 coaches total.

As with most train services in India, coach composition may be amended at the discretion of Indian Railways depending on demand.

Service

The 12157/58 Pune–Solapur Hutatma Express covers the distance of 264 kilometers in 4 hours 00 mins (66.00 km/hr) in both directions.

As the average speed of the train is above 55 km/hr, as per Indian Railways rules, its fare includes a Superfast surcharge.

Routeing

The 12157/58 Pune–Solapur Hutatma Express runs via , Kurduvadi to Solapur Junction.

Traction

A Pune–based WDM-3A or WDM-3D hauls the train for the entire route.

Time table

12158 Solapur–Pune Hutatma Express leaves Solapur Junction on a daily basis at 06:30 hrs IST and reaches Pune Junction at 10:30 hrs IST the same day.
12157 Pune–Solapur Hutatma Express leaves Pune Junction on a daily basis at 18:00 hrs IST and reaches Solapur Junction at 22:00 hrs IST the same day.

See also
 Pune–Bhusaval Express
 Pune–Solapur Intercity Express

References 

 Hutatma Express Map

External links

Express trains in India
Transport in Pune
Rail transport in Maharashtra
Transport in Solapur
Named passenger trains of India